BritNed is a 1,000MW high-voltage direct-current (HVDC) submarine power cable between the Isle of Grain in Kent, the United Kingdom; and Maasvlakte in Rotterdam, the Netherlands.

The BritNed interconnector would serve as a link for the foreseeable European super grid project.

History

The project was announced in May 2007.  
The installation of the first section of cable link started on 11 September 2009, 
The entire  cable was completed in October 2010.  It began operation on 1 April 2011, and as of January 2012, electricity flow has mostly been from the Netherlands to the UK.

Technical description
The capacity of the cable is 1,000MW. The interconnector has two converter stations for connecting the link with the British and Dutch high-voltage electricity transmission systems. The cable was produced by ABB and laid by Global Marine Systems, while the BAM Nuttall/Siemens consortium was responsible for the construction and equipping of the converter stations.  
BritNed was completed on time and within the budget of €600million.

Operators
The respective transmission system operators of the United Kingdom and the Netherlands - National Grid plc and TenneT; formed a joint venture to fund and operate the interconnection, independently from National Grid and TenneT's regulated businesses.

Outages 
BritNed has suffered a number of outages due to undersea cable faults in 2020/21. A significant outage happened on 9 March 2021 and was scheduled to be restored on 8 May 2021, but later delayed until 7 June 2021.

Coordinates

See also
 NorNed
 Gridlink Interconnector
 HVDC Cross-Channel, 2,000 MW between UK and France
 Icelink, a proposed link between Iceland and Great Britain 
 Nemo Link, 1,000 MW between UK and Belgium
 HVDC Norway–UK, 1,400 MW between UK and Norway
 List of HVDC projects in Europe
 Renewable energy in the United Kingdom
 Renewable energy in the Netherlands

References

External links

 Official website
 Current flow

Electrical interconnectors to and from Great Britain
Electrical interconnectors to and from the Synchronous Grid of Continental Europe
Electric power infrastructure in England
Electric power infrastructure in the Netherlands
Energy infrastructure completed in 2011
HVDC transmission lines
National Grid (Great Britain)
Electrical interconnectors in the North Sea
Netherlands–United Kingdom relations
2011 establishments in England
2011 establishments in the Netherlands